San Giovanni in Bragora is a church in Venice, Italy, located in the sestiere of Castello.

History
It was founded in the early 8th century, allegedly by St. Magnus of Oderzo; in the following century, under doge Pietro III Candiano, it was rebuilt to house the alleged relics of St. John the Baptist, to whom it is entitled, and again in 1178. Pietro Barbo, future Pope Paul II, and Antonio Vivaldi were baptised in the church.

The current appearance dates from the last renovation (1475-1505), which kept the basilica plan but added a brickwork façade in local late-Gothic style, and a façade divided into three sections.

The interior houses works by Cima da Conegliano (Baptism of Christ, 1492 and St. Helena and Constantine at the Cross, 1501-1503) and Alvise Vivarini and has a trussed ceiling.

The origin of the term Bragora is unclear. It could derive from the Greek agorà (square), referring to the campo facing the church, or from the dialect bragora ("market") or bragolare ("fishing"). It could also be from the word brago, meaning mud, on account of the former swampy state of islands of Venice. 

It is the church where Antonio Vivaldi was baptised in 1678. It is thought his family lived close to the church at the time.

External links

Official website

Giovanni in Bragora
8th-century establishments in Italy
15th-century Roman Catholic church buildings in Italy
Renaissance architecture in Venice